The Chronicles of Tornor is a fantasy series by American author Elizabeth A. Lynn. The first book in the series, Watchtower (1979), won a World Fantasy Award for Best Novel; its sequel, The Dancers of Arun (1979) was nominated for a World Fantasy Award in the same year. It is one of the earliest fantasy series to feature positive gay protagonists whose relationships are an unremarkable part of the cultural background, as well as to present explicit and sympathetic depictions of same-sex love. The third title in the series is The Northern Girl (1980).

Reception
Richard A. Lupoff praised Watchtower for its "characterization, the solidity of structure and the accomplishment of narration."

See also

Homosexuality in speculative fiction

References

Fantasy novel series
World Fantasy Award for Best Novel-winning works
LGBT speculative fiction novels
1970s LGBT novels